Fimbriaria is a genus of flatworms belonging to the family Hymenolepididae.

The genus has cosmopolitan distribution.

Species:

Fimbriaria czaplinskii 
Fimbriaria fasciolaris 
Fimbriaria intermedia 
Fimbriaria mergi 
Fimbriaria sarcinalis 
Fimbriaria teresae

References

Cestoda
Taxa named by Josef Aloys Frölich